Testosterone ketolaurate (INN, USAN) (brand names Androdurin, Testosid-Depot (with testosterone propionate)), also known as testosterone caprinoylacetate, is an androgen and anabolic steroid medication and a testosterone ester. It was introduced in 1956. It was marketed both as an oil solution and as a crystalline aqueous suspension.

See also
 Estradiol butyrylacetate/testosterone ketolaurate/reserpine
 Testosterone propionate/testosterone ketolaurate
 List of androgen esters § Testosterone esters

References

Androgens and anabolic steroids
Androstanes
Testosterone esters